Veronica Kamumbe Mutua (born 2 February 1992)  is a Kenyan track and field athlete, who competes in 400 meters. She competed at the 2017 IAAF World Relays, participating in the women's 400m and mixed 400m relay teams. She competed in the 2018 Commonwealth Games, reaching the semifinals in the women's 400m event. Her personal best in the 400 meters of 52.14 seconds was recorded on June 10, 2017.

She was born in Makueni County.

References

External links 
Veronica Kamumbe Mutua at IAAF

1992 births
Living people
Athletes (track and field) at the 2018 Commonwealth Games
Kenyan female sprinters
Commonwealth Games competitors for Kenya
People from Makueni County